Minos was a mythical king of Crete.

Minos may also refer to:

 Minos (dialogue), one of the dialogues of Plato
 Palace of Minos, a Bronze Age archaeological site on Crete
 , a tank landing ship
 Troides minos, the southern birdwing butterfly
 MINOS (optimization software), mathematical optimization software
 Minos EMI, a Greek record label formed by the merger of Minos Matsas & Son and EMIAL

People
 J. Minos Simon (1922–2004), author, lecturer, aviator, and sportsman
 Minos Kokkinakis (1919–1999), Greek Jehovah's Witness
 Minos (rapper), South Korean rapper, under Soul Company

Science
 6239 Minos, an asteroid discovered in 1989
 MINOS, main injector neutrino oscillation search, a particle physics experiment to study neutrino phenomena
 Minos: Revista de Filología Egea, a journal on studies of Mycenaean Greek and Aegean scripts

Other
 Minos Prime, a boss from the 2020 videogame Ultrakill